Dezhou Island, also known as Lu Yu, is an island in the waterway used by the Port of Shantou, 0.5 km from . It has an area of 0.136 square kilometers and has a well-preserved lighthouse that was built in 1880.

See also

 Mayu Island

Footnotes

References

"汕头市地名志"

Shantou
Islands of Guangdong
Islands of China
Populated places in China